List of all GWR Manor Class locomotives, built between 1938 and 1950.

References

 Great Western Archive

Gwr 7800 Class Locomotives